Falniowskia neglectissima is a species of freshwater snail with an operculum, an aquatic gastropod mollusk in the family Hydrobiidae, the snouted freshwater snails.

Distribution
F. neglectissima occurs in Southern Poland and Ukraine.

Habitat
F. neglectissima inhabits freshwater springs.

Conservation status
F. neglectissima was originally assessed as Near Threatened (LR/nt) for the 1996 IUCN Red List, as it is restricted to springs in a small geographical area. However, individuals have not been found since 1988 and it is currently considered data deficient; it is listed as critically endangered in the Polish Red Data Book of Animals.

References

Hydrobiidae
Gastropods described in 1989